Gianna Jessen (born April 6, 1977) is an American anti-abortion activist. She was born during a failed instillation abortion attempt. The 2011 film October Baby was loosely based on Jessen's life.

Early life
Jessen was born April 6, 1977, in Los Angeles, California. Her medical records indicate that she was born in the 30th week of pregnancy to a 17-year-old girl during a failed saline abortion. Jessen's birth certificate is signed by the doctor who was performing the abortion.

She describes it as a "tremendous gift". Jessen spent three months in the hospital before being placed in foster care. She was adopted at the age of four.

Career

1990s
Jessen's career as an activist began in 1991, when she was 14, after her adoptive mother, Diana DePaul, told Jessen she was born to a 17-year-old girl, during a failed abortion attempt. Jessen has since campaigned against abortion, saying "It's more comfortable for people to think of abortion as a political decision, or a right. But I am not a right. I am a human being". Jessen said she's forgiven her birth mother, but is not interested in a relationship with her, citing a strong relationship with her adoptive mother. Jessen has also campaigned against exceptions to late-term abortion laws, on the grounds of fetal disability, citing her own disability. Jessen appeared on the Maury Povich Show with her adoptive mother in 1991. In reporting her story and publicizing Jessen's early life to the nation, The New York Times observed that Jessen and Becky Bell, a teenage girl who reportedly died as a result of a botched unsafe abortion in 1988, had become the symbols of America's debate over abortion and characterized them as "poster girls whose stories are being shrewdly marketed by their supporters to keep passions high."  Jessen is a stage name that was adopted when she began her activism.

In 1995, four years after Jessen was placed in the national spotlight, author Jessica Shaver published a biography on Jessen. In early 1996, Festival of Light Australia sponsored an Australian tour, during which Jessen spoke at venues in all states and territories.

2000s
In his speech at the 2002 signing of the Born-Alive Infants Protection Act President George W. Bush mentioned Jessen, acknowledging her presence and extending his appreciation.

In December 2005 Jessen travelled to London to support a campaign to reduce the number of abortions under the UK Abortion Act and to speak at a parliamentary meeting at the House of Commons. Both the Archbishop of Canterbury and the Archbishop of Westminster indicated that they hoped her story would encourage Parliament to look again at abortion.

On May 8, 2006, the Colorado State House of Representatives considered a resolution honoring the 90th anniversary of a local branch of Planned Parenthood. Republican representative Ted Harvey invited Jessen to sing the national anthem to the House that day and then told her story "because, 'I just wanted to put a face to this celebration'."

In September 2008, Jessen was in Canberra, Australia, sponsored by the Australian Christian Lobby, to lobby federal politicians on late term abortions. The same month, Jessen appeared in a political advertisement during the 2008 US presidential campaign stating, "if Barack Obama had his way, I wouldn't be here", referring to Obama's opposition to "born alive" legislation.

2010s
In September 2015, Jessen testified at a Congressional hearing investigating Planned Parenthood's practices regarding fetal tissue donation, following the Planned Parenthood 2015 undercover videos controversy.  During her testimony, Jessen said she would ask Planned Parenthood the following question: "If abortion is about women’s rights, then what were mine?"

See also 
 The Oldenburg Baby, a German child born after a failed abortion attempt

References

External links 

  of Gianna Jessen
Gianna Jessen's page on The Abortion Survivors Network web site
 Born Alive Truth political advertisement featuring Gianna Jessen critical of Barack Obama's position on Born Alive legislation
 Gianna Jessen's address in Australia (YouTube)
 Gianna Jessen's interview on the Maury Povich Show, 1991
Gianna Jessen's testimony at Congressional Judiciary Committee hearing, September 9, 2015

1977 births
American anti-abortion activists
American disability rights activists
Living people
Activists from Los Angeles
People with cerebral palsy
California Republicans
Tennessee Republicans
Activists from Tennessee
American adoptees
American Christians